Slutsk (officially transliterated as Sluck, ; ; , , Yiddish/Hebrew: סלוצק Slutsk) is a city in Belarus, located on the Sluch River  south of Minsk. As of 2022, its population is 61,802. Slutsk is the administrative center of Slutsk District.

Geography

History
Slutsk was first mentioned in writing in 1116. It was part of the Principality of Turov and Pinsk, but in 1160 it became the capital of a separate principality. From 1320–1330 it was part of the domain of the Grand Duchy of Lithuania. Later it was owned by the Olelkovich and Radziwiłł families, which transformed it into a center of the Polish Reformed Church with a gymnasium and a strong fortress. 

Following the 17th century, the city became famous for manufacturing kontusz belts, some of the most expensive and luxurious pieces of garment of the szlachta. Because of the popularity of the cloths made here, belts worn over the żupan were often called of Slutsk despite their real place of origin.

Slutsk was part of Russian Empire after Second Partition of Poland in 1793. It was occupied by Germany in 1918 and by Poland between 1919 and 1920 during Polish Soviet War. In 1920, it was the centre of a major anti-bolshevik uprising known as the Slutsk defence action.

Until World War II and the Slutsk Affair, the city was predominantly Jewish; however, now the population includes no more than 100 Jews. 

Slutsk was occupied by the German Army on 26 June, 1941, and placed under the administration of Reichskommissariat Ostland. The period of German occupation ended on 30 June, 1944, when troops of the 1st Belorussian Front recaptured the town during the Minsk Offensive of the Red Army.

On 2 October 1967, a riot occurred during which the local court building was set on fire, resulting in the death of a judge and a police officer. The riot, unprecedented in post-WW2 Soviet Belarus, was triggered by the conduct of a murder trial, which was perceived to be unjust by the local residents.

Massacre of Jews 
During the German occupation of Slutsk, the Jewish inhabitants were systematically targeted for killing. The first Jewish victims were killed in the garden on Monakhov Street during the initial days immediately following the arrival of the Germans on 27 June, 1941. The victims numbered between 70 and 120, according to different sources. 

According to German sources the total number of victims was 3,400, while Soviet sources cite 8,000. These killings were carried out by two companies of the German 11th Reserve Order Police Battalion and the Lithuanian 2nd Battalion, which was a German-sponsored Schutzmannschaft or Auxiliary Police formation established in Kaunas, soon after the Nazi occupation of Lithuania.

According to survivors, the victims were driven to the execution site in two to four trucks on Mondays and Saturdays. The last Jews of the field ghetto were murdered on the Passover, 2-3 April 1942. The total number of Jews murdered at Bezverkhovichi is estimated to have been between 3,000 and 4,000.

One of the last significant massacres of Jews occurred on 8 February 1943, with the liquidation of the "town ghetto" of Slutsk. During the liquidation, some Jews fought back, shooting at the German and Latvian soldiers. In response, the Germans burnt the ghetto to the ground. Postwar court proceedings cite a minimum of 1,600 victims, of which 1,200 were murdered at the graves at Mokharty, the rest in the ghetto itself.

Jewish community 
The first indication of Jews in Slutsk is from 1583 when the city was part of Lithuania. Formal recognition came in 1601.  By 1623, Jews owned 16 homes. In 1691, Slutsk became one of the five leading communities of area of Lithuania. By 1750 there were 1,593 Jews.  Although this number represented a third of the cities population, 75% of the town's merchants were Jews, and a similar proportion accounted for Jewish ownership and merchandizing of alcohol. After annexation by Russia in 1793, growth of the city slowed, in part due to it being bypassed by the railroad. By 1897 the Jewish community numbered 10,264 inhabitants, or 77% of the city population. They played a central role in the cities markets, particularly in agricultural produce.

Slutsk was not insignificant in terms of Torah study. Among the rabbinic figures who served there were Yehudah Leib Pohovitser, Chayim ha-Kohen Rapoport, Yosef Dov Ber Soloveichik (1865–1874), and Isser Zalman Meltzer. The famous Slutsk-Kletsk Yeshiva was founded in Slutsk in 1883 by Rabbi Yaakov Dovid Wilovsky. Another outstanding scholar of learning in the Talmud and Torah who was also a Hebrew poet and became a Hebrew educator in the United States was Ephraim Eliezer Lisitzky, who was born and grew to his teens in Slutsk before emigrating to the U.S. According to legend the Baal Shem Tov visited Slutsk in 1733 at the invitation of Shmuel Ickowicz. Despite this, the town was known for its anti-hasidic misnagdim. The Haskalah and modern Jewish political parties also were represented among the population.

People 
Mikhail Basalyha – Belarusian painter
Uladzimir Basalyha – Belarusian painter
Isaac Dov Berkowitz – Jewish and Israeli author
Eliyahu Feinstein – rabbinic authority
Yaakov Yosef Herman – Orthodox Jewish pioneer in America
Semyon Kosberg – Jewish Soviet engineer
Shneur Kotler – rosh yeshiva, Lakewood yeshiva
Harry Lefrak – father of Samuel J. LeFrak, builder and realtor
Shmuel David Leibowitz-Father of Boruch Ber Leibowitz
Boruch Ber Leibowitz – leading rosh yeshiva
Yisroel Leibowitz-leading Rabbi in Vilna from 1926
Chaim Sholom Leibowitz-Son of Yisroel Leibowitz - Editor Of Birkas Shmuel, magnum opus of His Uncle Boruch Ber Leibowitz
Isser Zalman Meltzer – Rabbi of Slutsk from 1903 to 1923

Artur Nepokoychitsky (1813-1881), Imperial Russian military leader
Anastasiya Prokopenko, world champion and Olympic bronze medalist in modern pentathlon
Gregory Razran, (1901-1973), Russian American psychologist
Princess Sophia of Slutsk, medieval Eastern Orthodox saint
 Fabijan Šantyr (1887 - 1920), Belarusian poet, writer and public figure who is regarded as “the first victim of [the Bolsheviks] in…Belarusian politics and literature”
Edward Sperling – Jewish writer and humorist
Mikola Statkevich – Belarusian politician
Meyer Waxman – Rabbi and author
Mikhail Yakimovich – Belarusian handball player
Lidia Yermoshina – Belarusian politician
Shaul Yisraeli – religious Zionist rabbi

Twin towns — sister cities

Slutsk is twinned with:

 Brovary Raion, Ukraine
 Kalevalsky District, Russia
 Moshenskoy District, Russia
 Ryazansky (Moscow), Russia
 Rzhev, Russia
 Serpukhovsky District, Russia
 Shaki, Azerbaijan
 Sisian, Armenia
 Staromaynsky District, Russia

Former twin towns:
 Tczew, Poland

On 8 March 2022, the Polish city of Tczew ended its partnership with Slutsk as a response to the Belarusian involvement in the 2022 Russian invasion of Ukraine.

See also 
Slutsk Affair
Slutsk defence action
Slutsky
The Holocaust in Byelorussia
List of cities and towns in Belarus
Pas kontuszowy
Słuck Confederation

References

Gallery

External links 

 Home page of the city of Slutsk
 

 
Slucak
Populated places in Minsk Region
Slutsk District
Slutsky Uyezd
Dregovichs
Nowogródek Voivodeship (1507–1795)